The Sanitol Building, at 4252-64 Laclede Ave. in St. Louis, Missouri, was built in 1906.  It was listed on the National Register of Historic Places in 1985.

It is a two-story red-brown brick building, on a limestone foundation, which was built as a factory and offices building for the Sanitol Chemical Laboratory Company.  It was designed by architect George W. Hellmuth, and it includes Classical Revival detailing.

References

National Register of Historic Places in St. Louis
Neoclassical architecture in Missouri
Buildings and structures completed in 1906
1906 establishments in Missouri